Bolu is a city in northern Turkey, and administrative center of the Bolu Province and of Bolu District. Its population is 184,682 (2021).
 
The city has been governed by mayor Tanju Özcan (CHP) since local elections in 2019. It was the site of Ancient Claudiopolis and has also been called Eskihisar ("old fortress") (and as such has several Turkish namesakes).

Bolu is on the old highway from Istanbul to Ankara, which climbs over Mount Bolu, while the new motorway passes through Mount Bolu Tunnel below the town.

History

Antiquity until the Seljuk Turks 

Bolu was part of one of the Hittite kingdoms around 2000 BC and later 500 BC became one of the leading cities of the Greek Kingdom of Bithynia (279 BC - 79 BC). Bebryces, Mariandynes, Koukones, Thyns and Paphlagons are native people of the area in antique era. Strabo (XII, 4, 7) mentions a Hellenistic town, Bithynium, celebrated for its pastures and cheese, which according to Pausanias (VIII, 9) was founded by Arcadians from Mantinea.

In the Ancient Roman era, as is shown by its coins, the town was commonly called Claudiopolis after Emperor Claudius. It was the birthplace of Antinous, the posthumously deified lover of the Roman Emperor Hadrian, who was very generous to the city, and his name was later added to that of Claudius on the coins of the city. Emperor Theodosius II (408-50) made it the capital of a new province, formed out of Bithynia and Paphlagonia, and called by him Honorias in honour of his younger son and successor Honorius.

The city was known under Byzantine rule as Hadrianopolis (like many others; not to be confused with Hadrianopolis in Honoriade, also Constanti(n)a, now Viranşehir). After the Battle of Manzikert in which the Byzantines suffered a defeat at the hands of the Seljuks, Turkmens migrating west settled the city in the 11th century and it was referred to as Boli, Turkicized short for the Greek Polis 'city'. It was recaptured by Byzantines in 1097 but was conquered by the Seljuk Sultanate of Rum in 1197.

The Ottoman era 
In 1325, the town was conquered by the Ottoman Empire under Orhan, becoming known under the present Turkish name - sometimes called Bolou or Boli. It was also ruled by Candaroğlu between 1402 and 1423. It became the chief town of a sanjak in the vilayet (province) of Kastamonu and had a population of 10,000 inhabitants. Bolu was an Ottoman eyalet (state) until the Charter of States (Vilayetler Nizannamesi) of 1864, and was within the area stretching from Beykoz kazasi of İzmid sanjak to Boyabat kazasi of Sinop sanjak. In the late 19th and early 20th century, following the 1864 Vilayetler Nizannamesi, Bolu was part of the Kastamonu Vilayet of the Empire.

Ecclesiastical history

(Arch)Bishopric 
As secular capital of the Roman province of Honorias, in the civil Diocese of Pontus, the bishopric of Claudiopolis became the metropolitan see, in the sway of the Patriarchate of Constantinople, with five suffragan sees : Heraclea Pontica, Prusias ad Hypium, Tium, Cratia and Hadrianopolis in Honoriade. It appears as such in the Notitiae Episcopatuum of Pseudo-Epiphanius of about 640 and in that of Byzantine Emperor Leo VI the Wise of the early 10th century, ranking sixteenth viz. seventeenth among the Patriarchate's Metropolitans.
 
The city, known as Hadrianopolis (like many others) under Byzantine rule fell to Turkmens migrating west in the 11th century who called it Boli, was recaptured by Byzantines in 1097, besieged unsuccessfully by the Sultanate of Rum in 1177 and reconquered in 1197. Under Ottoman rule since the 14th century it lost to Heraclea Pontica the Metropolitan dignity. It ceased to exist as a residential bishopric in the 15th century.

Michel Lequien mentions twenty bishops of the see to the 13th century; documentary mentions are available for the following incumbent (Arch)bishops :
 the first is St. Autonomus, said to be an Italian missionary who suffered martyrdom under Diocletian. 
 Callicrates (mentioned in 363 in Socrates Scolasticus' church history)
 Gerontius (first actual historically documented bishop, in 394 attending the council against Metropolitan Bagadius of Bosra.
 Olympius (in 431)
 Calogerus (449 - 458)
 Carterius (menzionato nel 459)
 Hypatus (circa 518) [dismissed by Janin]
 Epictetus (in 536)
 Vincentius (in 553) [dismissed by Janin]
 Ciprianus I (in 680)
 only Janin also includes a bishop Sisinnius, attending the council in Trullo (692), but apparently assigns the same to namesake see Claudiopolis in Isauria
 Nicetas I (in 787)
 Ignatius, a friend and correspondent of Patriarch Photios I of Constantinople
 Ciprianus II (869 – 879)
 Nicetas II (10th–11th centuries)
 John (1028 - 1029).

Titular see 
The archdiocese was nominally restored by the Roman Catholic Church as a Latin Metropolitan titular archbishopric no later than the seventeenth century, first named Claudiopolis (Latin) / Claudiopoli (Curiate Italian), renamed in 1933 as Claudiopolis in Honoriade (Latin) / Claudiopoli di Onoriade (Italiano) / Claudiopolitan(us) in Honoriade (Latin).

It has been held by:
 Alfredo Bruniera (1954.12.12 – 2000.03.26)
 Alain Guynot de Boismenu, Sacred Heart Missionaries (M.S.C.) (1945.01.18 – 1953.11.05)
 Georges-Prudent-Marie Bruley des Varannes (1924.02.13 – 1943.05.29)
 Giuseppe Fiorenza (1905.12.11 – 1924.01.27)
 Giovanni Battista Bertagna (1901.03.26 – 1905.02.11)
 Joseph-Adolphe Gandy, M.E.P. (1889.01.15 – 1892.09.29)
 Eugène-Jean-Claude-Joseph Desflèches (范若瑟), Paris Foreign Missions Society (M.E.P.) (1883.02.20 – 1887.11.07)
 Carlo Gigli (1880.12.13 – 1881.08.24)
 Stephanus Antonius Aucher (1796.07.05 – ?)
 Tommaso Battiloro (1767.11.20 – 1767.12.14)
Titular Bishop: Joannes Nicastro (1724.09.11 – ?)
Titular Bishop: Walenty Konstantyn Czulski (1721.02.12 – 1724.02.10?)
Titular Bishop: Piotr Tarło (1713.01.30 – 1720.12.16)
 Jean-Baptiste Adhémar de Monteil de Grignan (1667.08.03 – 1689.03.09)
 Titular Bishop: Tomás de Paredes, Augustinians (O.E.S.A.) (1652.10.14 – 1667.02.17)

Places of interest 

The countryside around Bolu offers excellent walking and other outdoor pursuits. There are hotels in the town. Sights near the town include:
 The 14th-century grand mosque, Ulu Jamii.
 Bolu Museum holding artifacts from Hittite, Roman, Byzantine, Seljuk and Ottoman periods.
 The hot springs, Kaplıcalar.
 Lake Abant and village of Gölköy, near the university campus.
 The famous crater lake called Gölcük.
 Hayreddin-i Tokadi, the local saint whose shrine is visited by folk in an annual festival.

Culture

Architecture and sights 
Bolu is home to examples of Ottoman architecture. The Grand Mosque dates to 1899, but was originally built by Bayezid I and is home to decorations that resemble embroideries. The Kadı Mosque is perhaps the best example of classical Ottoman architecture in the city, having been built in 1499 and having its entrance embroidered with ornate kündekari works. Other Ottoman mosques in the city include the İmaret Mosque, built in the 16th century, Saraçhane Mosque, built in 1750, Ilıca Mosque, built in 1510–11, Karaköy Cuma Mosque, built in 1562-63 and Tabaklar Mosque, built in 1897.

The remains of the ancient city of Bithynium have been found in four hills in the city centre, Kargatepe, Hisartepe, Hıdırlıktepe and the Uğurlunaip Hill. In Hıdırlıktepe, a tomb and the remains of a theatre have been uncovered. In Hisartepe, a temple believed to have been built by the Roman emperor Hadrian for his lover Antinous has been excavated. In 1911, it was noted that "in and around [Bolu] are numerous marbles with Greek inscriptions, chiefly sepulchral, and architectural fragments."

Bolu Museum was established in 1975 to display and protect artifacts found in the Bolu area. It functions as both an archaeological and an ethnographic museum and is home to 3286 archaeological and 1677 ethnographic artifacts, as well as 12,095 historical coins. The archaeological artifacts chronicle the history of the area from Neolithic to Byzantine eras.

Cuisine 
Local specialities include a sweet made of hazelnuts (which grow in abundance here) and an eau-de-cologne with the scent of grass. One feature of Bolu dear to the local people is the soft spring water (kökez suyu) obtained from fountains in the town.

Media 
Bolu is home to 12 local newspapers published in the city centre, two local TV channels (Köroğlu TV and Abant TV), three local radio stations and six local magazines.

Economy 
Bolu is a busy market town rather than a large city.  It has one long shopping street and an attractive forested mountain countryside. Students from the university and soldiers based in Bolu make an important contribution to the local economy, which traditionally depended on forestry and handicrafts. Market day is Monday, when people from the surrounding villages come into town for their weekly shop.

The main road from Istanbul to Ankara used to cross Bolu mountain, although more people would stop at the roadside restaurants than actually come into the town, and anyway now the Mount Bolu Tunnel is open most people will rush by on the motorway rather than climb up into Bolu, especially in winter when the road has often been closed due to ice and snow. Some of the service stations on the mountain road have already announced their closure or moved elsewhere.

Climate 
Bolu has a borderline oceanic climate and humid continental climate (Köppen climate classification: Cfb, or Trewartha climate classification: Dcb), with chilly, snowy winters and warm summers with cool nights. Bolu is a usually cloudy and foggy city and annual sunshine hours are about 1,600. Unlike the low-lying, sheltered city center, many parts of the province, like Gerede, have a colder humid continental climate (Dfb/Dcb), due to cold winters. January mean temperature is 0.7 °C, July mean temperature is 19.9 °C.The lowest temperature recorded was -34 °C (-29.2 °F) in February 1929, and the highest was 39.8 °C (103.6 °F) in August 2006. Record snow thickness was 72 cm (28.3 inches) in February 1950.

Notable people 
 Antinous (c. 111 - c. 130), lover of Roman Emperor Hadrian, posthumously worshiped as a god
 Alexandru Callimachi (1737–1821), Prince of Moldavia

References

Sources and external links 

 Bolu - Kartalkaya Accommodation - Kartalkaya Golden Key
 Izzet Baysal University official website
 Anatolia.com - Bolu 
 Pictures of the city
 Information about Bolu city
 Bolu News
 Bibliography - ecclesiastical history
 Konrad Eubel, Hierarchia Catholica Medii Aevi, vol. 2, p. 130; vol. 4, p. 153; vol. 5, p. 161; vol. 6, p. 169
 Raymond Janin, lemma '1. Claudiopolis', in Dictionnaire d'Histoire et de Géographie ecclésiastiques, vol. XII, Paris 1953, coll. 1077–1079
 Michel Lequien, Oriens christianus in quatuor Patriarchatus digestus, Paris 1740, Vol. I, coll. 567-572
 Heinrich Gelzer, Ungedruckte und ungenügend veröffentlichte Texte der Notitiae episcopatuum, in: 'Abhandlungen der philosophisch-historische classe der bayerische Akademie der Wissenschaften, 1901, pp. 529–641 
 Pius Bonifacius Gams, Series episcoporum Ecclesiae Catholicae, Leipzig 1931, p. 442

 
Populated places in Bolu District
Ancient Greek archaeological sites in Turkey
Roman sites in Turkey